Zane's The Jump Off is an American television series on the Cinemax network, created by Zane. The series follows the lives of five successful African American men from all sorts of backgrounds as it tells the stories of their everyday lives. The series premiered March 29, 2013.

Plot
Zane's latest series follows five 30-something frat brothers and their women as they grapple with issues like commitment, fidelity and forgiveness.

Cast and characters

Main 
 Amin Joseph - Dmitri Vance
 Sean Riggs - Earnest Bishop
 J. Teddy Garces - Spencer Martinez
 Damian Raven - Gabriel Turner
 Kinyumba Mutakabbir - Fenwick "Woody" Wood

Recurring 
 Joe Torry - Chandler Bishop
 Tanjareen Martin - Lauren
 Gregg Wayans - Harris Jones
 Johanna Quintero - Portia Bishop
 Latifah Creswell - Brenda Lancaster
 Monique Cash - Nandi Carter
 Wlehyonneh Toles - Kenya Wood
 Sasha Van Duyn - Aspen Turner
 Jen Morillo - Sabrina
 Jude B. Lanston - Doctor Stovall
 Erika Jordan - Jennifer

Episodes

References

External links
 

2013 American television series debuts
2013 American television series endings
2010s American drama television series
2010s American romance television series
Cinemax original programming
Television series by Warner Bros. Television Studios
English-language television shows
Erotic television series
Television shows based on American novels